The Second Erhard cabinet was the government of Germany between 26 October 1965 and 30 November 1966. Led by the Christian Democratic Union Ludwig Erhard, the cabinet was a coalition between the Christian Democratic Union (CDU) and the Free Democratic Party (FDP).

Composition 

|}

Erhard II
1965 establishments in West Germany
1966 disestablishments in West Germany
Cabinets established in 1965
Cabinets disestablished in 1966
Erhard II
Ludwig Erhard